Kjell Gunnar Isaksson (born 28 February 1948) is a retired pole vaulter from Sweden, who broke the world record several times in 1972.

Pole vaulting
First he broke the record set by Christos Papanikolaou of Greece and San Jose State University two years earlier, by jumping 5.51 metres in Austin, Texas, becoming the second man to clear 18 feet.  A week later he improved it to 5.54 m in Los Angeles, California. His technique inspired several aspects of the Petrov/Bubka model. Two months later he added another centimeter at a meet in Helsingborg, Sweden.  His record reign was ended on 2 July 1972 when the reigning Olympic champion Bob Seagren jumped 5.63 m at the U.S. Olympic Trials. Isaksson set his personal best at 5.59 m in El Paso, Texas, on 23 May 1972.

Isaksson competed at the 1968, 1972 and 1976 Olympics with the best result of tenth place in 1968. In 1972 he was handicapped by a sudden change of rules by the IAAF and could not clear any height. He appeared on the cover of Track and Field News several times starting in April 1971, then March, April and June 1972 (with Seagren). Nationally he won the pole vault title in 1968–71 and 1973–79 and was active in bowling in the 2000s.

Superstars
Isaksson achieved international fame in the late 1970s as one of the most successful Superstars competitors, winning two European titles and finishing second in the inaugural 1977 World Championship.  He dominated the European competition in 1975 and 1976, defeating the British Superstar David Hemery twice, and scoring 56 points (out of a maximum 80) in the 1975 final. Isaksson was particularly strong in the running events (where he would only be allowed to compete after giving away "handicaps" to his rivals) and the gymnasium. He would gain extra points in weightlifting contests by lifting higher weights in proportion to his body weight than his heavier opponents. This gave him a major chance in the 1977 World Championship, though he was hindered by the IAAF disqualifying him from professional athletics competition (and thus the running events).  This was to give his American rival Bob Seagren a major advantage.  Now retired from athletics, Seagren was free to compete in the running events and scored enough points here to beat Isaksson into second place.  Until Brian Hooper won the last World Final in 1982, Isaksson was the most successful European Superstar ever.

Superstars record

References

External links
 
  1971 Year Ranking

1948 births
Living people
Swedish male pole vaulters
Athletes (track and field) at the 1968 Summer Olympics
Athletes (track and field) at the 1972 Summer Olympics
Athletes (track and field) at the 1976 Summer Olympics
Olympic athletes of Sweden
World record setters in athletics (track and field)
European Athletics Championships medalists
World record holders in masters athletics
People from Härnösand
Sportspeople from Västernorrland County